The House of Delegates was a body in the Tricameral Parliament of South Africa which existed from 1984 to 1994. It was reserved for Indian South Africans. The body was elected twice; in 1984 and 1989.  It was the second time in South Africa's history that Indians had ever had any sort of representation at the national level, the first being the South African Indian Council. It was originally to be called the Chamber of Deputies. 

The debating chamber of the House of Delegates located in Marks Building, a new building that was located across the road from Houses of Parliament, Cape Town.  The executive arm of the House of Delegates was a Ministers' Council, led by a Chairman.
The civil service that dealt with Indian "own affairs" (including education, health and welfare, local government, housing and agriculture) was called Administration: House of Delegates, and was based in Durban.

Elections

Electoral turnouts for elections to the House of Delegates were poor.

Election results:

Leadership

The following served as Chairman of the Minister's Council of the House of Delegates: 

Amichand Rajbansi (September 1984 - 31 December 1988
Kassipershad Ramduth (1 January 1989 - 21 March 1989) (acting)
Jayaram Narainsamy Reddy (21 March 1989 - February 1993) 
Bhadra Galu Ranchod (February 1993 - March 1994)

References

 SOUTH AFRICA: parliamentary elections House of Delegates, 1989

Defunct national legislatures
Defunct organisations based in South Africa
Apartheid government
Organisations associated with apartheid
1984 establishments in South Africa
1994 disestablishments in South Africa
Indian diaspora in South Africa